The 2010 GFF National Super League was the third season of the National Super League under its current format, and the twentieth reported season of top tier Guyanese football. The champions for the second consecutive year were Alpha United who did not lose a single match during the campaign. As champions, Alpha United, along with league runners-up, Milerock earned a berth into the 2011 CFU Club Championship. 

The season began in February and ended in September.

Teams

Regular stage

Table

Playoff stage 
 RSSSF

References 

GFF Elite League seasons
Guyana
Guyana
football